Goodville is an unincorporated community and census-designated place (CDP) in East Earl Township, Lancaster County, Pennsylvania, United States. As of the 2010 census the population was 482.

Geography
Goodville is located along Pennsylvania Route 23 in northeastern Lancaster County, in the eastern part of East Earl Township. PA 23 leads northeast  to the Pennsylvania Turnpike at Morgantown, and southwest  to Lancaster, the county seat.

The community is in the watershed of the Conestoga River, a west-flowing tributary of the Susquehanna.

Demographics

References

Populated places in Lancaster County, Pennsylvania
Census-designated places in Lancaster County, Pennsylvania